The 1780 Vermont Republic gubernatorial election took place throughout September, and resulted in the re-election of Thomas Chittenden to a one-year term.

The Vermont General Assembly met in Bennington on October 12. The Vermont House of Representatives appointed a committee to examine the votes of the freemen of Vermont for governor, lieutenant governor, treasurer, and members of the governor's council. Thomas Chittenden was re-elected governor. Benjamin Carpenter was re-elected lieutenant governor, and Ira Allen was re-elected as treasurer. The names of candidates and balloting totals were not recorded.

Results

References

Vermont gubernatorial elections
1780 in Vermont
1780 elections in North America